WRYT is a radio station broadcasting out of Edwardsville, Illinois with a Catholic format. It broadcasts on AM frequency 1080 kHz and is part of the Covenant Network.

Because WRYT shares the same frequency as "clear channel" station KRLD in Dallas/Fort Worth, Texas, the station broadcast during the daytime hours only until April 9, 2014.

WRYT's studios are located on Hampton Avenue in St. Louis, while its transmitter is located near Edwardsville.

History

WRYT went on the air November 9, 1987, but while the station promoted itself as WRYT in local media, its callsign was legally WHRC (standing for original owners Horizon Radio Corporation) until February 4, 1988, when it exchanged call letters with TV channel 46 in Norwell, Massachusetts, which founder Bob Howe also owned. As a commercial station, WRYT broadcast adult standards music and news programming aimed at listeners in Edwardsville and Madison County, Illinois.

The station was sold in 1992 to the Hometown Broadcasting Company, owned by Tom Lauher, of Creve Coeur, Missouri. Five years later, he sold the station to Covenant founder Tony Holman, whom he found "more serious and interested and less on a fishing expedition". Covenant Network began operating WRYT, its first station on May 1, 1997.

References

External links

The Covenant Network
WRYT / KHOJ Programming Schedule

Catholic radio stations
RYT
Radio stations established in 1987
1987 establishments in Illinois